Ross Haslam (born 2 October 1997) is a British diver. He has represented Great Britain at numerous international events including the European Championships where he won a silver in the mixed synchronised 3 metre springboard, and the World Cup where he won a bronze medal in the same event.

Background
Ross Haslam was born in Sheffield on 2 October 1997.  He first started diving when he was 6. He has a brother Jack who is also a diver.

Career
Haslam first won an individual senior national medal with a bronze in the 10 metre platform at the 2012 British National Cup. The same year he started representing Great Britain in the European Junior Championships.

In 2015, at the inaugural European Games held in Baku where the diving events are for juniors only, he won a silver in the men's synchronised 3 metre springboard with James Heatly.

In 2018, at the FINA World Cup in Wuhan, China, he won a bronze in the mixed synchronised 3 metre springboard with Grace Reid.

At the 2018 European Championships in Glasgow/Edinburgh, Haslam partnered with Grace Reid for the second time as her partner in this event Tom Daley had taken paternity leave for the rest of year. They won a silver in the mixed synchronised 3 metre springboard.

References

External links
 
 
 
 
 

1997 births
Living people
English male divers
Commonwealth Games competitors for England
Divers at the 2018 Commonwealth Games
European Games silver medalists for Great Britain
European Games medalists in diving
Divers at the 2015 European Games